Nizhe (Cyrillic: Ниже; Russian for "below") is the second studio album by Finnish doom metal band KYPCK, released on 9 February 2011 by Fono Records in CIS and by Playground Music in Europe.

The last song, "Vals Smerti", is an instrumental. It is dedicated to the memory of Sentenced guitarist Miika Tenkula, who died in 2009.

Track listing

Personnel 
E. Seppänen – vocals
S. S. Lopakka – guitar
J. T. Ylä-Rautio – bass
K. H. M. Hiilesmaa – drums

Chart

References 

KYPCK albums
2011 albums
Russian-language albums